Cactophagus is a genus of snout and bark beetles in the family Dryophthoridae found in Central America, southern North America, and northern South America. There are more than 50 described species in Cactophagus.

Species
These 56 species belong to the genus Cactophagus:

 Cactophagus amoenus
 Cactophagus annulatus
 Cactophagus aurantiacus Hustache, 1936
 Cactophagus auriculatus Chevrolat & L.A.A., 1882
 Cactophagus aurocinctus
 Cactophagus bifasciatus E.Csiki, 1936
 Cactophagus bolivari
 Cactophagus carinipyga
 Cactophagus ciliatus Champion, 1910
 Cactophagus circumdatus
 Cactophagus circumjectus
 Cactophagus cirratus Champion, 1910
 Cactophagus consularis Hustache, 1936
 Cactophagus dragoni Anderson, 2002
 Cactophagus duplocinctus
 Cactophagus fahraei
 Cactophagus foveolatus Günther, 1941
 Cactophagus gasbarrinorum Anderson, 2002
 Cactophagus hustachei Günther, 1941
 Cactophagus impressipectus Voss, 1953
 Cactophagus lineatus Anderson, 2002
 Cactophagus lingorum Anderson, 2002
 Cactophagus major Fåhraeus & O.I., 1845
 Cactophagus mesomelas
 Cactophagus metamasioides Günther, 1941
 Cactophagus miniatopunctatus Chevrolat & L.A.A., 1882
 Cactophagus morrisi Anderson, 2002
 Cactophagus nawradi Chevrolat & L.A.A., 1882
 Cactophagus obliquefasciatus Chevrolat & L.A.A., 1882
 Cactophagus ornatus
 Cactophagus perforatus E.Csiki, 1936
 Cactophagus procerus E.Csiki, 1936
 Cactophagus pruinosus
 Cactophagus pulcherrimus Champion & G.C., 1910
 Cactophagus quadripunctatus Chevrolat & L.A.A., 1882
 Cactophagus rectistriatus
 Cactophagus riesenorum Anderson, 2002
 Cactophagus rubricatus Hustache, 1936
 Cactophagus rubroniger Fisher, 1926
 Cactophagus rubronigrum Fisher, 1926
 Cactophagus rubrovariegatus Bovie, 1907
 Cactophagus rufocinctus Champion, 1910
 Cactophagus rufomaculatus Champion, 1910
 Cactophagus sanguinipes Hustache, 1936
 Cactophagus sanguinolentus (Olivier & A.G., 1791)
 Cactophagus sierrakowskyi Champion & G.C., 1910
 Cactophagus silron Anderson, 2002
 Cactophagus sinuatus
 Cactophagus spinolae Champion, G.C., 1910
 Cactophagus sriatoforatus Champion & G.C., 1910
 Cactophagus subnitens Casey & T.L., 1892
 Cactophagus sunatoriorum Anderson, 2002
 Cactophagus tibialis Waterhouse & O.C., 1879
 Cactophagus validirostris Champion & G.C., 1910
 Cactophagus validus Champion & G.C., 1910
 Cactophagus venezolensis Günther, 1941

References

External links

 

Weevils